Edmund Janes James (May 21, 1855 – June 17, 1925) was an American academic, president of the University of Illinois from 1904 to 1920, and the primary founder, first president and first editor for the American Academy of Political and Social Science.

Early Years 
James was born in Jacksonville, Illinois and was the son of Methodist minister, Colin Dew James, and Amanda Keziah (Casad) James. For his secondary school education, he went to a high school from Illinois State Normal University (now known as Illinois State University) and graduated in 1873. Between 1974 and 1875, he attended a year at each Northwestern and Harvard but said to not have enjoyed what Harvard had to offer. As a result, he transferred to the University of Halle, where he studied economics under the direction of Johannes Conrad. He earned a doctorate in political economy in 1877 with a thesis on the American tariff.  Upon his return to the United States he received an appointment as a high school principal.

University of Pennsylvania 
James was a public finance and administration professor at the Wharton School of Finance of Economy and teaching political and social science in the Department of Philosophy. In addition to his teaching, he would later become the director of the Wharton School of Finance and Economy.  When James arrived in 1883, he wanted to change the way the students were being taught if they were to be pursuing business careers and in this statement about the Wharton School of Finance and Economy, he gave to the American Bankers' Association in 1890, he explicitly states, 

"It was these considerations then that determined Mr. Wharton to establish this school. First: the belief that the business classes of our country need a higher training as much or more than any other classes; second the view that the commercial or business college, however, real and valuable its higher training, does not in its present form furnish a kind of higher training of the community, as is shown by the fact of the small number of youths looking to business careers who enter college." 

While in Philadelphia, James organized the American Academy of Political and Social Science to foster research to help solve important social problems. In 1884, he was elected as a member to the American Philosophical Society.

Trustees of the university and many of the staff were conservative in making them not heavily favor the idea of having focus on economics and political science with courses in accounting, banking, and business law. In 1896, James was dismissed from the university. An observation made by Dr. Edward Potts Cheyney in 1940 on both James’s and Robert Ellis Thompson’s departure, he stated, “The departure of both [James and Thompson] was a serious and unnecessary loss to the University; it has not had too many men of their stature, and neither need have gone if greater reasonableness had been exerted."

Northwestern University 
James arrived after the presidency of Henry Wade Rogers (1890-1900) and Daniel Bonbright (1900-1902). The trustees had seen excited to finally find their man for the job because of his impressive resume in addition to his philosophy on higher education was in relation to their goals. When arriving, James and the trustees agreed to make the university the top Methodist institution of higher education in the country. There was a problem financially to make moves for the benefit of the university and that made the trustees concerned with the debt they were getting themselves into. In a letter from the chairman of the board of trustees, M.H. Wilson, to James, it states, “[NU] is ambitious to develop and broaden that curriculum as rapidly as a wise administration of its resources will permit; [W]e cannot believe that on this proposition, your judgement will differ from our own.”

When James first arrived, he immediately saw the problems across the university and was bound to change them. For example, he saw an education that can be improved but hold back because of faculty and supporting staff having problems academically and professionally. The reason, from his own words, the faculty were having problems was because of the library being below average in addition to it being not well funded. There were also science laboratories and professional schools that were seen as unacceptable which James recommended there be a graduate school and a technical school. Gymnasium, residence halls, a dining hall, a chapel, and a student union were all missing in the university but again rose the question of whether the trustees would approve of all these changes?

He was able to only convince them of creating a Jubilee Memorial Fund to celebrate semi-centennial in 1905 but had other ideas of trying to raise funds. He tried marketing the school’s name with the football, baseball, and debate teams and with academics like alumni groups, scholarships, and fellowships. He tried to make Andrew Carnegie an advocate of the school but ended when Carnegie found out the relation the school with the Methodist religion. 

His run as president ended short because the trustee’s disappointment and distrust in him. James’s run as summarized by Northwestern business manager, William A. Dyche, “I sometimes feel that James’s wide horizon and his eagerness to plan for the years ahead were, from a practical standpoint, a source of weakness. Possibly if he had not had so many things in mind, each of which was beyond criticism, he might have been satisfied with his labors."

University of Illinois Urbana-Champaign 
He agreed to become the University of Illinois' fourth president in August 1904.  Ten years before he accepted, he had been notified of the job offer. His initial objective was to establish contacts with various influential people across the nation and spend some time visiting campuses. 

Before leaving the position of president, Dr. Draper had advised James to “[raise] scholarly standards and [improve] instruction,” and to also the University had already gotten as much help as they could possibly get from the state of Illinois. James had ignored the financial part and wanted to ask for more from the state. It was at that time the state had their spending increasing for all areas and that was an opportunity for the University to make sure to get funding for their needs and benefit from them for years and the door opened more when the states' budget had increased over the last decade. 

In the six months he took office, James received an advance from the legislature of half a million dollars. Two years later he got another half a million dollars. In 1909, there was three million dollars given once again by the legislature in which two years later, there was 200 thousand dollars, in addition to, the mill tax law. The law granted the financials’ future to be set. The money that was acquired in James’s run as president were seven times more than what was acquired in the 36 years prior to his arrival.

Ten years had gone by and a celebration honoring the achievement had been made by the University Senate on Commencement Day of 1914. A summary of James’s presence and achievements done the past decade as told by David Kinley,

“His have been large and far-reaching plans. He has seen the vision and has dreamed the dream. He has planned largely and asked largely, and therefore we have been treated with corresponding liberality. In physical development; in the enlargement of our faculty; in raising our standards and ideals of scholarship and investigation; in giving the world a proper estimation of the importance and progress of the University of Illinois –in all the elements of progress during the decade. Edmund James has inspired, has led, has achieved. With infinite patience and kindly tact and wisdom he has met and solved difficulties and opposition, and has overcome obstacles. He has always accepted and profited by kindly criticism. Over and over again he has skillfully turned hostile criticism to the accomplishment of the very purposes against which it was directed. Without ceasing he has impressed upon faculty and students the need for constantly rising standards of scholarship, and the importance of productive scholarship. In all that makes a man a great and successful university president, Edmund James has met the test, step by step, through the years he has been with us, raising the University to an ever higher level of work and reputation.”

On July 1919, after his struggles with his health, he was granted a year’s leave of absence with the goal that he would return well rested and in good health. After a year, it looked like there was no progress and, in the spring of 1920, he gave his resignation. A letter to the board in which he said how much the position had meant to him and was better suited for a younger man. Two years prior to his granted resignation, he had previously wanted to resign from the position to enlist in the war and had said many times, “too young for the civil war and too old for this one.” Even though the University had become a military academy and was helping the war, he was still not satisfied with this accomplishment.

Legacy in U.S.-China relations
President James had the vision to build strong ties with China through education as early as 1906. That year, James wrote to President Theodore Roosevelt proposing a plan to establish scholarships for Chinese students to come to the U.S., this was later known as the "Boxer Indemnity Scholarship Program" (庚子賠款獎學金). James in his letter noted: "China is upon the verge of a revolution […] The nation which succeeds in educating the young Chinese of the present generation will be the nation which for a given expenditure of effort will reap the largest possible returns in moral, intellectual and commercial influence."

President James established ties with China through the Chinese Minister to the United States, Wu Ting-Fang, and created a direct connection between China and the Urbana campus. James also set up the first office for foreign students in the United States. Between 1911 and 1920, the University of Illinois was educating a third of all the Chinese students in the United States; many that held degrees from Illinois later influenced China's development, including Coching Chu (class of 1913) who is known as "Father of Chinese Meteorology". Edward Y. Ying (class of 1939) was influential in the planning of modern Shanghai. H.Y. Moh (class of 1913) later became a cotton manufacturer and government minister.

Personal life 
James married Anna Margarethe Lange on August 22, 1879, whom he met during his time at the University of Halle. 

They had in total of 3 children named Anthony John, born in 1885, Herman Gerlach, born in 1887, and Helen Dickson, born in 1889. James never had the best health with the contribution of working late and not having much exercise except for his hobby of horseback riding. It was said that he would ride around campus in his horse peeking at a window or looking at many lands in the area.

He lived in the old white house in front of the campus until the first world war came and made it be used for the Y.M.C.A for the school of military aeronautics. He then resided to a house on Nevada St., later to be used by successor David Kinley. 

James was known to have many acquaintances around the country and around the world. He had known many professors from different universities around the world. In conversations with many faculty, he was always talking about many topics. He was an educated man and would be up to date with many books which would range from mathematics to natural sciences. He was a kind person, and a faculty member said the reason behind all his kindness was because he wanted to be appreciated.

Motivation was a big factor in James’s persona, and it would show when he would motivate the University to achieve and reach for more. In a convocation on December 3, 1914, he said:

“I should like to have it said that at Illinois the members of the faculty from student assistants in the laboratories to the heads of departments show the keenest interest in the work and welfare of the students, helping them when they need help, inspiring them, holding them moreover always strictly to their work, as the most moral lesson which can be taught to a student.”

Death 
On June 17, after living for 5 years on a farm near Covina, California, he had died at the age of 70. His death was caused by uraemia and hardening of the arteries.

In the funeral service, the University senate marched in their academic uniform with the active and honorary pallbearers beside them. In the sermon by Reverend James C. Baker, he would talk about the personal characteristics James had. David Kinley gave a speech summarizing the achievements of his old friend and leader. In addition to the speech, Kinley also recited a poem, it states:

“The foothills of the mountain range

Sweep downwards to the given;

And who’d plant truth on the mountain top

Must climb the hills between;

O’er range on range, up peak on peak,

His toilsome path pursue,

And on each peak his beacon light,

While he plans his work anew.

The light from the beacon on each hill

In widening circles sweeps,

And evil, ignorance and fear

Are swept from plain and steeps.

Then up to the light walk the children of men,

O’er the way that their leader has trod,

Where o’er torrent and crag and peak he has blazed

A path to the city of God

Such, Edmund James, is the way you have walked

Through the years of your dwelling time here,

As up the hills of knowledge you’ve led

With courage, wisdom and cheer,

I give you greeting, Edmund James,

In the name of the women and men

Who’ve walked through dark and light with you,

And know you a leader of men."

Notes

References

External links

1855 births
1925 deaths
American economists
Harvard University alumni
Leaders of the University of Illinois
Martin Luther University of Halle-Wittenberg alumni
Northwestern University alumni
Presidents of the American Economic Association
University of Chicago faculty
University of Pennsylvania faculty
Members of the American Philosophical Society
People from Jacksonville, Illinois